Maiah Ocando is an actress and Internet personality now living in Los Angeles, California. She studied Fashion Design at the Brivil Institute and Filmmaking at the School of Cinema and Television in Caracas. She is the host of the YouTube webshow Visto Bueno and writer of the book series of the same name. She co-created and hosted the online series She Looks Like, hosted "Holiday House" and was featured as a co-host on the TV and online series Vive El Verano for NBC Universo.

In 2014 Ocando signed a talent development deal with Disney-ABC for artist's services as a host for a future television show.

Early work

In 2011, Ocando contributed as a stylist for the world's first online sci-fi series filmed entirely using only mobile phones. The project, titled Planeta N8, was one of three finalists in the P&M Awards 2012, and was developed for the Nokia N8 advertising campaign.

Ocando's first webshow was Umoda TV, covering emerging fashion designers, makeup artists, photographers and supermodels for the region. The series was featured on Planetaurbe TV, the first online TV network for youngsters in Latin America.

Before that, Ocando was a singer, who released a rock-pop album in 2005 titled A través de mis ojos ("Through my eyes"). The album contained ten songs, for which Ocando was the vocalist.

Visto Bueno and other projects

Ocando's Visto Bueno series was nominated for two Streamy Awards 2013 as Best International Series and Series of the Year; in 2014 in Fashion, First Person and Entertainer of the Year categories; and again in 2015 in Fashion. She was the first Latina to be nominated three years in a row, and hers was the only Spanish-speaking show nominated.

Ocando's content was featured on a regular basis on AOL, Huffpost video, and the Uvideos platform. The Venezuelan website La Patilla and the Venezuelan TV channel Globovision also featured her work.

In 2014, Ocando landed a talent deal with ABC and moved to LA to continue working on her projects. She also signed a deal the same year to take part in the digital show Gentlemen's Code alongside the rapper Pitbull, accompanied by Shira Lazar, Brittany Furlan, Simone Sheperd and Kandee Johnson. In September 2015, Ocando signed an endorsement deal with Ford Motors U.S. It was also announced that NBC Universo had teamed up with several Latino social media stars to launch the series Vive el Verano, which has Ocando amongst its stars.

For the 2015 Streamy Awards, Ocando was chosen by VH1 to be their promotional image. She also hosted Vanity Fairs official viewing party and Tweet Up for the Emmys in 2015.

In February 2015, Ocando participated as principal speaker at a panel in the We Are Grow Summit pre-treat that took place at the YouTube Space in Los Angeles.

In March 2015 Ocando was invited as a speaker at the SXSW Festival in Austin, Texas to discuss how Latino social stars are better at engaging with audiences, as well as making themselves more appealing to advertisers, networks and studios. In June, she joined forces with Honda to create a song to tell a story on how multicultural millennials in America are shaped by their Hispanic roots and their everyday life. "Mis Dos Mundos" was written by Gabriel Torrelles, Daniel Norman and the L.A band Elah, performed by Ocando, and produced by Torrelles at the Paramount Recording Studios in Hollywood, California. The song received more than 400,000 views on YouTube in the first week.

On November 5, 2015, Ocando was invited to speak at the Women in Entertainment inaugural summit presented by Arclight in partnership with the Geena Davis Institute on Gender in Media and Women in Film, hosted by Gretchen McCourt, EVP of Programming for Pacific Theaters. On the Digital Game Changers panel that closed the summit, Ocando had an inspiring participation, encouraging women to "pick up a camera and start their own youtube channel".

On June 17, 2016 Ocando spoke on the panel "Be a Maker, Not A Taker" at the Voto Latino's Power Summit in Las Vegas, Nevada. This professional development conference educates, engages and empowers American Latino millennials. The conference brings together dynamic leaders to network, explore resources and learn how to grow their careers from cross-industry experts.

In July 2016, Ocando signed a content development deal with Univision. As part of the deal, Ocando and her partner, writer/producer, Gabriel Torrelles, created and starred a portfolio of new series on beauty, fitness, relationships, fashion and DIY projects aimed at multicultural millennial women in America, as well as serve as their digital correspondent, creating innovative social content and formats for platforms such as Snapchat and Facebook Live. In September 2016, Ocando joined the team of Noticias Univision #EdicionDigital, the first network newscast conceived, designed and produced for live simulcast on digital/social platforms plus broadcast television, and the only noon network newscast in the United States.

In December 2016 Dear Maiah, a digital series starring Ocando, premiered. It was developed in collaboration with Fullscreen's AT&T Hello Lab, with Ocando serving also as executive producer and creative consultant for the series. A digital spin on an advice column, Dear Maiah encouraged Ocando's fans to ask her questions relating about everyday life. The show received nearly 3.3 million total video views, and was a finalist for "Best Use Of Instagram" and "Mobile Campaign" at the 9th Annual Shorty Awards in March 2017.

In the spring of 2017, Ocando and Torrelles created one of the first hour-long podcasts in Spanish language in the US. The podcast No sé, dime tú (I don't know, you tell me) comments on pop culture, current events and their lives as immigrants fighting for the American dream in Los Angeles. The podcast was named one of the "9 Latinx Podcasts You Should Be Listening To Right Now" by Latina Magazine.

Books

In 2013 Ocando signed a deal with Editorial Cadena Capriles and launched a collection of six books based on the Visto Bueno series. The collection sold out in six weeks. The digital version of the series reached #1 on Amazon in US, Spain and Mexico, and stayed on the best seller list for several weeks.

Personal life

Ocando is in a longtime relationship with writer and producer Gabriel Torrelles, whom she married in 2014 in Los Angeles, and who is the co-creator and producer of Visto Bueno.

Awards and nominations

References

Living people
Spanish-language YouTubers
Venezuelan YouTubers
Venezuelan emigrants to the United States
Women video artists
Year of birth missing (living people)
Beauty and makeup YouTubers
Comedy YouTubers
21st-century Venezuelan actresses
Actresses from Los Angeles
Fashion YouTubers
Writers from Los Angeles
21st-century Venezuelan women writers
21st-century American women